Hostile Witness is a 1968 British courtroom drama film based on a play by Jack Roffey, directed by Ray Milland (who had appeared in the play on Broadway) and starring Milland, Sylvia Syms, Raymond Huntley and Julian Holloway.

Plot
A distinguished barrister finds himself on the wrong side of the law when accused of the murder of the motorist who killed his daughter.

Cast
 Ray Milland as  Simon Crawford – Q.C.  
 Sylvia Syms as Sheila Larkin  
 Felix Aylmer as Justice Osborne  
 Raymond Huntley as John Naylor  
 Geoffrey Lumsden as Major Hugh Beresford Maitland  
 Norman Barrs as Charles Milburn  
 Julian Holloway as Percy
 Percy Marmont as Justice Matthew Gregory  
 Dulcie Bowman as Lady Phyllis Gregory  
 Ewan Roberts as Hamish Gillespie  
 Richard Hurndall as Superintendent Eley  
 Ronald Leigh-Hunt as Dr. Wimborne

Production
The play debuted in 1964 starring Michael Denison and transferred to the West End.

Jay Julien bought the production rights to stage the play in the United States. In 1965, Ray Milland agreed to appear in the play in New York. It was Milland's first theatrical appearance in some years, apart from appearing in a road version of My Fair Lady. The New York Times called it "serviceable". The show at a capitalisation of $125,000 and ended on July 2 after 157 performances. Milland then took the play on tour. The Los Angeles Times called the production "absorbing, completely satisfactory, and wholly successful thriller."

In March 1967, it was announced that Milland would star in and direct a film version for Edward Small and United Artists. Shooting began in London in July 1967 with David Rose producing.

Critical reception
DVD Talk wrote: "It's not terrible and has its moments, but Billy Wilder's Witness for the Prosecution or your average episode of Rumpole of the Bailey is a lot more fun." The entry in Halliwell's Film Guide states: "Complex courtroom thriller, filmed in a flatly boring way with stagey sets and performances. The plot is the only interest". A review in the Radio Times by Joanna Berry described it as an "interesting but ultimately disappointing tale", which Berry considered "missable".

References

External links
 
Hostile Witness at Letterboxd
Hostile Witness at BFI

1968 films
1968 drama films
British drama films
British courtroom films
Films directed by Ray Milland
British films based on plays
1960s English-language films
1960s British films